Alice Curtis is a personal name. Alice Curtis may refer to:
 Alice B. Curtis (1874–1956), American suffragist, professor, writer
 Alice Turner Curtis (1860–1958), American writer